KOGA-FM (99.7 FM) is a radio station broadcasting a classic hits format. Licensed to Ogallala, Nebraska, United States, the station serves the North Platte area.  The station is owned by iHeartMedia. The station's nickname, "The Lake," is in reference to Lake McConaughy, located north of Ogallala.

Former Logo

References

External links

OGA-FM
Classic hits radio stations in the United States
IHeartMedia radio stations